Adonijah Reid (born August 13, 1999) is a Canadian soccer player who currently plays for Pacific FC in the Canadian Premier League.

Early life
Reid began playing youth soccer with Caledon SC, in 2005. Afterwards, he joined ANB Futbol Academy, where he played for six years. In 2014 and 2015, he had trials with French clubs OGC Nice and Lyon, and also had trials with clubs in Italy and Spain. However, as he was not a European citizen, he was unable to remain in Europe.

Club career
In 2015, at age 16, he played with ANB Futbol in League1 Ontario. He finished as the league's joint highest goalscorer as a 16 year old with 20 goals in 20 appearances earning joint Golden Boot honours. He was also named the league's Young Player of the Year and was named a First Team All-Star.

In January 2017, Reid signed a Generation Adidas contract with Major League Soccer, being part of the first Generation Adidas Canada class. He was then selected in the second round (40th overall) of the 2017 MLS SuperDraft by FC Dallas. During the 2017 pre-season, he scored a goal in a friendly against Arentinian club River Plate. However, as he was under the age of 18, he was unable to appear for Dallas in an official match, due to FIFA regulations. In July 2017, he was loaned to USL club Ottawa Fury FC. He would make his professional debut on July 29, 2017 against Toronto FC II. On August 12, 2017, he scored his first professional goal in a 3-1 victory over the Charlotte Independence. In March 2018, he re-joined Ottawa for a second loan stint. On June 24, 2018, Reid scored a hat trick in a 3-0 win over New York Red Bulls II. The performance earned him USL Player of the Week honours. At the end of the season, he was named to the USL 20 under 20 list, coming in at #8. Over his two years on loan with Ottawa, he scored five goals in 41 league matches. After the 2018 season, Dallas declined his contract option for 2019.

In January 2019, Reid signed with French side Le Havre AC. He played with the second team in the Championnat National 2.

In January 2021, Reid signed with Miami FC of the USL Championship. On May 29, 2021, he scored his first goal for the club against the Charlotte Independence. On October 30, 2021, he scored a brace against the Charleston Battery.

In January 2023, he signed with Pacific FC of the Canadian Premier League.

International career
In 2011, he played for Eastern Canada for the Danone Cup qualifiers, where his team defeating the Western Canada team to advance to the international U12 tournament, where Canada finished sixth and Reid scored against England.

Reid made his debut in the Canadian national team program at a Canada U15 identification camp in March 2014. He then attended several other U15 and U18 camps over the next couple of years. In January 2018, he was called to a Canada U23 camp in preparation for qualification for the 2020 Summer Olympics]]. Reid was named to the Canadian U20 squad for the 2018 CONCACAF U-20 Championship. On November 4, 2018, he scored his first international goal in Canada's second match against Guadeloupe, netting the game-winner in a 2-1 victory.

Reid is also eligible to play for Jamaica through his parents.

Career statistics

References

External links

Living people
1999 births
Association football forwards
Canadian soccer players
Canadian sportspeople of Jamaican descent
Black Canadian soccer players
Canadian expatriate soccer players
Expatriate soccer players in the United States
Canadian expatriate sportspeople in the United States
Expatriate footballers in France
Canadian expatriate sportspeople in France
FC Dallas draft picks
FC Dallas players
Ottawa Fury FC players
Le Havre AC players
Miami FC players
League1 Ontario players
USL Championship players
Championnat National 2 players
Canada men's youth international soccer players
ANB Futbol players
Soccer players from Brampton
Pacific FC players